Jönssonligan på Mallorca (The Johnson Gang in Mallorca - International: English title) is a Swedish film made in 1989, and is one of a series about a criminal gang called Jönssonligan.

This was the last film in the series where Gösta Ekman played the part of Sickan.

Cast 

 Gösta Ekman as Charles-Ingvar 'Sickan' Jönsson
 Björn Gustafson as Dynamit-Harry
 Ulf Brunnberg as Ragnar Vanheden
 Birgitta Andersson as Doris
 Per Grundén as Morgan Wall-Enberg
 Margaretha Krook as Gertrude Germann
 Dan Ekborg as Gren
 Kent Andersson as Persson
 Johann Neumann as Ödlan
 Roland Janson as Brother

External links 

Jönssonligan films
1989 films
Swedish comedy films
Films set in Spain
Films directed by Mikael Ekman
1980s Swedish films